Proparco is a Development Finance Institution partly owned by the French Development Agency (AFD) and private shareholders from the developed countries.

PROPARCO promotes private investment in Africa, Asia, Latin America, and the Middle East to reach the Sustainable Development Goals (SDGs). PROPARCO finances operations which are economically viable, financially profitable, environmentally sustainable and socially equitable. , its shareholders' capital exceeded €693 million (US$773 million).

From 2019, Proparco is participating in the Choose Africa initiative launched jointly with AFD to accelerate the growth of African SMEs, which consists of making available 2.5 billion euros over 4 years: 1.5 billion in bank loans and guarantees and 1 billion in equity investments in SMEs (direct investments or through private equity funds). In 2020, to play its part in the response to the COVID-19 crisis, Proparco is adding €1 billion under the Choose Africa Resilience plan.

Impacts in 2016
In 2016, the projects supported by Proparco contributed to
 the creation or maintaining of 142 000 jobs directly and 732 000 indirectly
 the production of 802 Gigawatts/hour (GWh) of renewable energy
 6000 students receiving high quality services in financed establishments
 406 M€ of value added in the countries of intervention through salaries and benefits

Shareholders
The shareholding in PROPARCO is as depicted in the table below:

 French Financial Institutions include
 BNP Paribas 
 BCPE IOM
 CDC Entreprises Elan PME (BpiFrance)
 Crédit Agricole
 Société Générale

 International Financial Organizations include
 Aga Khan Fund for Economic Development (AKFED)
 Banque Marocaine du Commerce Extérieur (BMCE)
 Bank of Africa Group (BOA Group)
 Banque Ouest Africaine de Développement (BOAD)
 Corporación Andina de Fomento (CAF)
 Development Bank of Southern Africa (DBSA)
 German Investment Corporation (DEG)

 French companies include
 Bouygues
 Bolloré Africa Logistics
 Saur International
 Socotec international
 SOMDIAA 
 SIPH
 ENGIE
 
 Investment Funds & Foundations include
 Jean-Pierre Godon
 Amundi AFD Avenirs Durables
 Natixis Solidaire

See also
 German Investment Corporation
 Danish International Development Agency
 French Development Agency
 Netherlands Development Finance Company

References

External links
 PROPARCO Homepage
  Website of Agence Française de Développement (AFD)

Investment management companies of France
Companies based in Paris
Development finance institutions